Marieke Birgitta van Doorn (born 15 June 1960 in Rotterdam) is a former Dutch field hockey midfielder, who was a member of the National Women's Team that won the golden medal at the 1984 Summer Olympics.

Four years later in Seoul she captured the bronze medal with the Dutch national side. From 1982 to 1988 she played a total number of 100 international matches for Holland, in which she scored 29 goals. She retired after the 1988 Summer Olympics and was in charge as a hockey coach in the 1990s at her former club HGC.

External links
 
 Dutch Hockey Federation

1960 births
Living people
Dutch female field hockey players
Olympic field hockey players of the Netherlands
Field hockey players at the 1984 Summer Olympics
Field hockey players at the 1988 Summer Olympics
Dutch field hockey coaches
Sportspeople from Rotterdam
Olympic gold medalists for the Netherlands
Olympic bronze medalists for the Netherlands
Olympic medalists in field hockey
Medalists at the 1988 Summer Olympics
Medalists at the 1984 Summer Olympics
HGC players
HGC coaches
20th-century Dutch women
21st-century Dutch women